Nick or Nicholas Rogers may refer to:

Nick Rogers (American football) (1979–2010), Arena Football League linebacker
Nick Rogers (sailor) (born 1977), British sailor
Nicholas Rogers (cyclist) (born 1987), American cyclist
Nicholas Rogers (runner), American athlete
Nicholas Rogers (politician), British politician
Nicholas Rogers (actor), Australian model and actor